Hearts is the fifth studio album by American folk rock trio America, released by Warner Bros. Records in 1975. The album was produced by long-term Beatles producer George Martin, the second of seven consecutive albums he produced with America.

This album was a big hit in the US, reaching number 4 on the Billboard album chart and being certified gold by the RIAA. It produced three hit singles: "Sister Golden Hair", which went to number 1 on the Billboard singles chart and number 5 on the adult contemporary chart; "Daisy Jane", which peaked at 20 on the Billboard singles chart and number 4 on the Adult Contemporary chart; and the funky "Woman Tonight", which reached 44 on the Billboard singles chart and 41 on the Adult Contemporary chart. Several other songs received radio airplay on FM stations playing album tracks including "Company", "Old Virginia", "Bell Tree" and "Midnight". The album was also released on Quadrophonic reel-to-reel tape for 4-channel enthusiasts.

The cover was designed by Phil Hartman, who eventually left graphic design to pursue acting.

Cash Box said of the single "Woman Tonight" that "instead of the expected [ballad], the boys dash off some good new-fashioned change." Record World said that rather than "America's soft, willowy sound," "Woman Tonight" is a "hearty rockin' romp with a reggae flavor."

Track listing

Personnel
America
Gerry Beckley – vocals, guitar, keyboards
Dewey Bunnell – vocals, guitar
Dan Peek – vocals, guitar, keyboards
with:
David Dickey – bass
Willie Leacox – drums, percussion
George Martin – keyboards
Uncredited - cello (on "Daisy Jane")
Clydie King, Venetta Fields - background vocals "Story of a Teenager"

Production
George Martin – producer, arranger
Geoff Emerick – engineer
Mark Guercio – assistant engineer
Henry Diltz – photography at Golden Gate Bridge, San Francisco, California
Phil Hartman – art direction, design

Charts

Certifications

References

1975 albums
America (band) albums
Albums produced by George Martin
Warner Records albums